"Smack That" is a song by American singer and songwriter Akon featuring American rapper Eminem from the former's second studio album Konvicted (2006). Produced by the latter, it was written by the artists alongside Mike Strange and Luis Resto. The collaboration came after the two artists met during a recording session for Shady Records rapper Obie Trice. The song received acclaim from contemporary music critics for being a great club song.

"Smack That" was released as the first single from the sophomore Konvicted on September 26, 2006. Commercially, the song reached number one on 10 record charts and peaked inside the top 10 in nine, including the Billboard Hot 100, where it peaked at number two. It received several gold and platinum certifications and sold over three million downloads in the United States. The song earned a Grammy nomination for Best Rap/Sung Collaboration.

Background and release
In the year of 2006, Akon met Eminem during his recording sessions for Snitch with rapper Obie Trice, a Shady Records signee at the time, and the two became fast friends. Akon wanted him to be on "Smack That", but knew about Eminem's claims on being featured on too many songs. After receiving a call from the rapper saying he was ready to go, Akon flew out to Detroit. On recording with Eminem, Akon stated that it was "no different than working with any of the other artists, really."

"Smack That" was written, produced and programmed by Eminem, with additional writing from Akon, Mike Strange and Luis Resto. Strange and Resto also played the keyboards present on the track. Strange worked with Tony Compana to record the song, which took place at 54 Sound in Detroit, Michigan, where Strange also mixed the song with Eminem. "Smack That" is an upbeat R&B and hip hop song that has been described as "a real summer party song."

"Smack That" was released worldwide for digital distribution on September 25, 2006, and serviced to mainstream and rhythmic crossover radio on October 12, 2006, in the United States. A two-track version of the single, featuring "Senegal" as a B-side, was released internationally on October 9, 2006. That same day, an extended play containing two extra songs – "Miss Melody" and "Senegal" – was released.

Critical reception
"Smack That" garnered acclaim from contemporary music critics, with many calling it a great club song. DJ Z of DJBooth, in a review of the single, commended "Smack That" for showcasing "Akon's ability to sound perfect over any tempo beat." In his review for the album as a whole, DJ Z wrote that the song and "I Wanna Love You" display Akon's skill during collaboration. Michael Enelman of Entertainment Weekly lauded the collaboration with Eminem as the "liveliest." David Marchese of Spin magazine classified the single as "Played-out G-funk braggadocio and bedroom boasting." Elysa Gardner of USA Today lauded it as "irresistibly slick." A writer for The Manila Times deemed the song "deliriously energetic" while claiming it has "all the ingredients of a masterful club banger."

Dan Raper of PopMatters had a mixed opinion about Eminem's feature, writing that the lower register he adopts for his voice is "not totally successful", but added that it "shows some innovation from the Old White Rapper." Ivan Rott wrote a more negative review of the song, dismissing its production as "prosaic" and its lyrics as "uninspired." He further added that the song "holds no weight in comparison to current club tracks such as "Money Maker," the bouncy collaboration between Ludacris and Pharrell, among others. Expect "Smack That" to drop off the charts as fast as it popped up."

"Smack That" was nominated for Best Rap/Sung Collaboration at the 2007 Grammy Awards, but lost to Justin Timberlake's "My Love".

Chart performance
In the United States, "Smack That" debuted on the Billboard Hot 100 at  95 on the issue dated October 7, 2006. One week later, the song jumped 88 spots to  7, aided by its digital download sales (67,000) and rise in radio impression (30.5 million audience). The song earned the distinction of achieving the highest jump on the Hot 100 chart at the time. Three weeks later, aided by the strength of 91,500 downloads, the song climbed to its peak position at number two, where it remained for five consecutive weeks, barred from the top spot by Ludacris' "Money Maker", Justin Timberlake's "My Love", and Akon's own single "I Wanna Love You". "Smack That" has sold over 3,227,000 downloads as of April 29, 2012, earning a triple-platinum certification by the Recording Industry Association of America.

In Europe, "Smack That" experienced commercial success. In the United Kingdom, the song debuted at number 12 on November 12, 2006, and rose to number one in the following week, becoming Akon's second and Eminem's seventh UK number one. The single was successful in Belgium, topping the chart in Wallonia and peaking at number three in the Dutch-language Flanders region. It was later certified gold by the Belgian Entertainment Association (BEA). In Sweden, the song debuted at number nine on October 12, 2006. Three weeks later, it reached a peak of number three, where it remained for three non-consecutive weeks. "Smack That" earned a Platinum certification from the Grammofonleverantörernas förening (GLF) in 2007. The song peaked at number one in Czech Republic, Ireland, Norway, and Slovakia.

"Smack That" entered the singles chart in Australia on November 13, 2006, at number five. The song fluctuated within the top 10 for six weeks before reaching its peak at number two, a position it held for three nonconsecutive weeks. The single lasted 26 weeks on the chart and earned a platinum certification from the Australian Recording Industry Association (ARIA). In New Zealand, "Smack That" debuted on the singles chart in New Zealand on November 20, 2006, at number two. The song held the position for two more weeks before falling to number 14 in its fourth week and 21 in its fifth week. The single got a second wind, rising to number five in the following week. Two weeks later, "Smack That" reached the chart's summit, where it remained for four nonconcsecutive weeks. The song earned a gold certification from the Recorded Music NZ (RMNZ).

Music video
The song's music video is a short-clip remake of the 1980s film 48 Hrs. Directed by Benny Boom, it presents Akon as a convict in prison who is let out of jail by a police officer, Jack Gates (Eric Roberts), who is looking for a witness. Akon is let out for 24 hours to do anything he pleases as long as he can find the female witness. He is given a photo of her and follows a lead he was given that the witness is in a nightclub. While in the club, Akon meets up with fellow rapper and his friend Eminem. Akon finds the female witness and escapes from the nightclub without Jack Gates. This is the first video that features Eminem with his then-new tattoo 'PROOF' on his left arm, which is dedicated to his friend, DeShaun Dupree Holton who was murdered after he was shot by a bouncer in an after-hours spot. The video also features cameos from Fat Joe, Lil Fizz of B2K, Layzie Bone of Bone Thugs-n-Harmony, Nas and Kendra Wilkinson (of E!'s The Girls Next Door) and actor Mark Casimir Dyniewicz Jr. as the bartender. The music video was nominated for Best Earthshattering Collaboration and Male Artist of the Year at the 2007 MTV Video Music Awards.  The video also received three nominations for Best Male Artist, Best  Hip Hop Video, and Best Hook-Up at the 2007 MTV Australia Video Music Awards.

Remix
Smack That was remixed on Eminem Presents: The Re-Up. The remix features vocals from Stat Quo and Bobby Creekwater. The second and third line of the original's beginning is cut out. Akon sings the first verse, which has different lyrics to the original, Stat Quo sings the second verse and Bobby Creekwater sings the third verse.

Awards and nominations

Track listing
These are the formats and track listings of major single releases of "Smack That".

Digital download

Digital download (clean version)

Digital single (2 track version)

EP

NBA version

Credits and personnel
Locations
Recorded and mixed at 54 Sound in Detroit, Michigan

Personnel
Akon – songwriting, vocals
Tony Compana – recording
Eminem – songwriting, Production, programming, Mixing
Luis Resto – songwriting, keyboards
Mike Strange – songwriting, recording, mixing, keyboards

Charts

Weekly charts

Year-end charts

Decade-end charts

All-time charts

Certifications

!scope="col" colspan="3"| Mastertone
|-

Release history

See also
List of Romanian Top 100 number ones of the 2000s

References

2006 singles
Akon songs
Eminem songs
Song recordings produced by Eminem
European Hot 100 Singles number-one singles
Number-one singles in Hungary
Irish Singles Chart number-one singles
Number-one singles in New Zealand
Number-one singles in Norway
Number-one singles in Romania
UK Singles Chart number-one singles
Music videos directed by Benny Boom
Songs written by Akon
Songs written by Eminem
Konvict Muzik singles
SRC Records singles
Universal Motown Records singles
2006 songs
Songs written by Luis Resto (musician)